Bageshwar Legislative Assembly constituency is one of the 70 assembly constituencies of Uttarakhand; a northern state of India. Bageshwar is part of Almora Lok Sabha constituency.

Members of Legislative Assembly

Election results

2022

2017

2012

2007

2002

See also
 Almora (Lok Sabha constituency)

References

External links
  
 http://eci.nic.in/eci_main/CurrentElections/CONSOLIDATED_ORDER%20_ECI%20.pdf
 http://ceo.uk.gov.in/files/Election2012/RESULTS_2012_Uttarakhand_State.pdf
 http://www.elections.in/uttarakhand/assembly-constituencies/purola.html

Statistical Reports UP Assembly
 1967
 1969
 1974
 1977
 1985
 1980
 1989
 1993
 1991
 1996

Bageshwar district
Assembly constituencies of Uttarakhand